Kenneth McTaggart Chisholm (12 April 1925 – 30 April 1990) was a Scottish footballer, who played for a number of teams in The Football League and the Scottish Football League as a forward.

Club career
Chisholm, a former RAF fighter pilot, began his professional footballing career at Queen's Park, joining the club in 1942. During his time with the club, he represented Scotland in a wartime victory international, playing in a 3–2 victory over Ireland. During wartime, he also featured for several English clubs, including Manchester City and Chelsea as a guest player, before moving to Partick Thistle in 1946 where he made 34 appearances and scored 13 goals. In 1948, he joined Leeds United for a fee of £6,000 after the club failed in their attempt to sign Jimmy Mason from Third Lanark. Between 1948 and 1949 he scored 17 goals in 40 appearances for the Whites but fell out with manager Frank Buckley. He instead joined Leicester City in 1949, with Ray Iggleden moving to Elland Road in exchange, and went on to make 42 appearances scoring 17 goals.

Chisholm made the switch to Midlands rivals Coventry City in 1950, he made 68 appearances and scored 34 goals for the club before transferring to Cardiff City in March 1952. He made his debut in a 6-1 defeat against Sheffield United but went on to score 8 times in the last 11 games of the season to help secure promotion for the club. He finished as top scorer in his first season and shared top league scorer with Wilf Grant the following season, netting his only hattrick for the club in October 1953 in a 5–0 victory over Charlton Athletic. Chisholm left the Cardiff to sign for Sunderland and made his debut for them on 1 January 1954 against Aston Villa in a 2–0 win at Roker Park where he also scored a goal. During his time at the club he made 78 league appearances scoring 33 goals. He finished his career with Workington in 1956, before a short spell at Glentoran just before his retirement.

References

1925 births
1990 deaths
Footballers from Glasgow
Scottish footballers
Manchester City F.C. wartime guest players
Chelsea F.C. wartime guest players
Leicester City F.C. wartime guest players
Portsmouth F.C. wartime guest players
Bradford (Park Avenue) A.F.C. wartime guest players
Queen's Park F.C. players
Partick Thistle F.C. players
Leicester City F.C. players
Coventry City F.C. players
Cardiff City F.C. players
Sunderland A.F.C. players
Workington A.F.C. players
Glentoran F.C. players
Leeds United F.C. players
English Football League players
Scottish Football League players
Scottish football managers
Glentoran F.C. managers
Association football forwards
Scotland wartime international footballers
FA Cup Final players